Belbin may refer to:

People
 David Belbin (born 1958), British novelist and academic
 Meredith Belbin (born 1926), British researcher and academic
 Susan Belbin (born 1948), British television director and producer
 Tanith Belbin (born 1984), Canadian-American ice-dancer
 Tracey Belbin (born 1967), Australian field hockey player

Other uses
 Belbin Team Inventory, a form of psychometric testing